Zero Magazine was an American music magazine from San Jose, California that covered punk, rock, and metal music from the San Francisco Bay Area. It was founded by Larry Trujillo in 1992 and published monthly until July 2008.

SF Weekly said that Zero Magazine "could very well revive local music reporting". The Sacramento State Hornet said it was "one of the most widely known music magazines in the Northern California area".

References 

Monthly magazines published in the United States
Music magazines published in the United States
Defunct magazines published in the United States
Magazines established in 1992
Magazines disestablished in 2008
Magazines published in the San Francisco Bay Area